Clayton Brown (born 16 September 1940) is a Canadian rower. He competed at the 1960 Summer Olympics and the 1968 Summer Olympics.

References

1940 births
Living people
Canadian male rowers
Olympic rowers of Canada
Rowers at the 1960 Summer Olympics
Rowers at the 1968 Summer Olympics
Rowers from St. Catharines